The Spain women's national under-16 and under-17 basketball team is a national basketball team of Spain and is governed by the Spanish Basketball Federation. 
It represents the country in international under-16 and under-17 (under age 16 and under age 17) women's basketball competitions.

Tournament record

World Cup

European Championship

See also
Spain women's national basketball team
Spain women's national under-20 basketball team
Spain women's national under-18 basketball team
Spain men's national under-17 basketball team
Spain men's national under-16 basketball team

References

External links

Women's national under-16 basketball teams
Women's national under-17 basketball teams
Basketball